Prentiss is an unincorporated community in Putnam County, in the U.S. state of Ohio.

History
Prentiss had its start as a station on the railroad. A post office called Prentiss was established in 1896, and remained in operation until 1902.

References

Unincorporated communities in Putnam County, Ohio
Unincorporated communities in Ohio